Siegfried Schneider (born 7 April 1956, Oberzell) is a German politician from Bavaria for the CSU political party in Germany  and was as chief of the State Chancellery in the Cabinet Seehofer.
On 22. June 2015 he became chairman of TSV 1860 Munich.

References

1956 births
Living people
Politicians from Bavaria
Christian Social Union in Bavaria politicians
Ministers of the Bavaria State Government